This is a list of Indonesian drinks. The most common and popular Indonesian drinks and beverages are teh (tea) and kopi (coffee). Indonesian households commonly serve teh manis (sweet tea) or kopi tubruk (coffee mixed with sugar and hot water and poured straight in the glass without separating out the coffee residue) to guests. Fruit juices (jus) are very popular, and hot sweet beverages can also be found, such as bajigur and bandrek.

Many popular drinks are based on ice (es) and can also be classified as desserts. Typical examples include young coconut (es kelapa muda), grass jelly (es cincau) and cendol (es cendol or es dawet). As a Muslim-majority country, Indonesian Muslims share Islamic dietary laws that prohibit alcoholic beverages. However, since ancient times, local alcoholic beverages were developed in the archipelago. According to a Chinese source, people of ancient Java drank wine made from palm sap called tuak (palm wine).

Hot beverages

Cold beverages

Alcoholic beverages

See also

 Alcohol in Indonesia
 Coffee production in Indonesia
 Indonesian cuisine
 List of Indonesian dishes

References

External links

Indonesian drinks
Indonesia
Drinks